Imamzadeh Mausoleum (Barda) 
 Imamzadeh Mausoleum (Shamakhi) 
 Imamzadeh Mausoleum (Nehram) 
 Imamzadeh (Ganja)